William Leslie Bowles (26 February 1885 at Leichhardt, Sydney, Australia – 21 February 1954 at Frankston, Victoria) was an Australian sculptor and medallist.

Education 
He started at Kangaroo Point State School, Brisbane. After studying at the Brisbane Technical College Leslie Bowles won 1910 a scholarship for studies in Great Britain. There he met other sculptors like Sir Bertram Mackennal, and he was a student at the Royal Academy.

Life 
Bowles was a soldier in the First World War. He lived in England until his marriage with Mary Lees of Kelso in 1924. Australia. Then they lived in Prahran, Melbourne. He was survived by his wife.

Work 

He started work in Mackennal's studio. After the war he worked and exhibited in England. Later in the Twenties in Australia, William Leslie Bowles was employed at Melbourne Exhibition Building on the Australian War Memorial. In 1926 he had become a member of the Royal Society of British Sculptors. He became mainly connected with the design of large monuments, nevertheless he was also invited to design Australian coins and medals.

Bowles designed the sculpture of Sir John Monash which stands at the Shrine of Remembrance in Melbourne. He designed several sculptures at the Australian War Memorial in Canberra, including the Man with the donkey (a tribute to John Simpson and his donkey). He designed the memorial for the 9th Battalion (AIF) in the crypt of Brisbane's Anzac Square. Bowles designed decorative bronze window panels for the Queensland Commonwealth Bank Building in Queen Street, Brisbane (built 1927-1930) with his work depicting the trinity images of Industry, Agriculture and Commerce. He designed sculptures of "Diana and her hounds" and others for Fitzroy Gardens in Melbourne in 1935. He designed the King George V memorial in Melbourne. He designed engravings for Australian banknotes released in 1953.

Notes 

1885 births
Artists from Sydney
British Army personnel of World War I
Numismatics
20th-century medallists
Australian designers
1954 deaths
20th-century Australian sculptors
Military personnel from Queensland
Australian expatriates in England
Australian people of Irish descent
Alumni of the Royal Academy Schools
London Regiment soldiers
Royal Tank Regiment soldiers